Timandromorpha discolor is a species of moth of the family Geometridae first described by William Warren in 1896. It is found in Asia, including India, Thailand and Taiwan.

The wingspan is 46–58 mm.

References

Moths described in 1896
Geometrinae